Karabulak (Qarabūlaq) is a settlement in Eskeldi District in Almaty Region of south-eastern Kazakhstan. It is the capital of the district. Population:

References

Populated places in Almaty Region